Florida Commuter Airlines was a small U.S. regional airline based out of Palm Beach International Airport that evolved directly from Roberson Air, Inc., which did business as Red Baron Airlines. This happened when Dr. Rudolph P. Scheerer bought out Dr. Clive E. Roberson for a 100% stake in the airline on June 13, 1980.  The management structure remained the same except for Dr. Clive E. Roberson.  On July 24, 1980, Florida Commuter Airlines received its carrier operating certificate as a commuter and charter operator.  It was certified to fly 2 DC-3s and a Piper PA-31 Navajo.  On September 9, 1980, an interline agreement was signed with Air Florida.  An interline and a bilateral agreement was also signed with Eastern Airlines.

Route
The airline offered weekday flights starting in the morning from West Palm Beach, Florida, and stopping in Gainesville, Florida, before continuing to Tallahassee, Florida, and then Jacksonville, Florida.  In the afternoon the route was the reverse.  Finally in the late afternoon the flight path was West Palm Beach, Gainesville, Tallahassee, and the reverse for the evening.  On Saturday and Sunday, Jacksonville was not a destination.

The airline later became Southern Airlines in 1981 shortly after the Florida Commuter Airlines crash of a Douglas DC-3 in the Bahamas on September 12, 1980.

Accidents and incidents
All 34 on board were killed. The aircraft was on an international non-scheduled passenger flight from Palm Beach International Airport, United States, to Grand Bahama International Airport. Although the cause of the accident was never determined, it is known that the aircraft flew into a thunderstorm and that there were pre-existing deficiencies with the pitot tube and static system on the aircraft. Florida Commuter Airlines were criticized for their poor maintenance regime.

See also 
 List of defunct airlines of the United States

References

 
Defunct regional airlines of the United States
Airlines established in 1980
Airlines disestablished in 1981
1980 establishments in Florida
1981 disestablishments in Florida
West Palm Beach, Florida
Defunct companies based in Florida
Defunct airlines of the United States